Uppsala County held a county council election on 19 September 2010, on the same day as the general and municipal elections.

Results
The number of seats remained at 71 with the Social Democrats winning the most at 22, a loss of one from 2006. The party received 31.1% of a valid vote of 212,057.

Municipalities

References

Elections in Uppsala County
Uppsala